Idhu Unga Kudumbam is a 1989 Indian Tamil-language film directed by S.Umesh, starring Raghuvaran, Raadhika and Urvashi . The film was remade in Kannada as Baalina Daari.

Cast

Raghuvaran
Raadhika
Urvashi

Soundtrack 
Soundtrack was composed by Hamsalekha.
"Vetri Murasu" - K. S. Chithra
"Thavi Vantha" - K. J. Yesudas, S. Janaki
"Muthuswamy" - Malaysia Vasudevan, K. S. Chithra
"Ambalaikku Nenjil" - Malaysia Vasudevan, K. S. Chithra
"Naanamo" - Malaysia Vasudevan, K. S. Chithra

References

1980 films
1989 films
1980s Tamil-language films
Films scored by Hamsalekha
Kannada films remade in other languages